Julia Marton-Lefèvre (1946, Budapest) is a French - US environmentalist and academic. She studied history, ecology and environmental planning in the US and in France, and was born in Hungary.

Career 
She was Director General of IUCN, the International Union for Conservation of Nature, from 2007 to mid January 2015. Prior to this, Marton-Lefèvre was Rector of the University for Peace (UPEACE), a graduate-level international university, mandated by the United Nations, providing education, training and research on issues related to peace and conflict. Earlier offices held by Marton-Lefèvre include Executive Director of LEAD (Leadership for Environment and Development) International , a programme established by The Rockefeller Foundation to bring together and train mid-career leaders from all parts of the world in improving their leadership skills around the issues of sustainable development, and Executive Director of the International Council for Science (then known as ICSU). She began her international career in a programme on environmental education at UNESCO.

Institutional affiliations 
At present, Marton-Lefèvre is focusing on using her broad experience to advise organizations to help them achieve their goals. She chairs several international groups: the Executive Committee of the Tyler Prize for Environmental Achievement, the Donor Council of the Critical Ecosystems Partnership Fund, the Board of Trustees of the recently merged CGIAR Centers: the Alliance of Bioversity International and CIAT (the International Center for Tropical Agriculture) and the Strategy Advisory Council to the Institute for Sustainable Development and International Relations (IDDRI). In 2019 she was elected to be a member of the Bureau of the Intergovernmental Science-Policy Platform on Biodiversity and Ecosystem Services (IPBES) .

Her links with academic institutions are with Yale University, where she spent 2016 as the Edward P. Bass Distinguished Visiting Environmental Scholar. She continues her links with Yale at the School of the Environment by teaching and mentoring students as a Fellow of Davenport College, and as a board member of the Environmental Leadership and Training Initiative.  She also serves on the Advisory Boards of Oxford University's James Martin School, the Julie Ann Wrigley Global Institute of Sustainability (Arizona State University) and the International Risk Governance Center based at the Federal Polytechnic Institute in Lausanne (EPFL) . She recently completed a 10-year term as a founding member of the board of the Geneva-based Graduate Institute of International and Development Studies, and remains a member of the advisory board of the institute's Center for Environmental Studies.

Marton-Lefèvre's other board memberships include the Prince Albert II of Monaco Foundation, the Wildlife Conservation Society (WCS), the Global Footprint Network, the Turkana Basin Institute,  the Oceanographic Institute- Prince Albert 1st of Monaco Foundation,  and the advisory board of TEEB (The Economics of Ecosystems and Biodiversity). In the corporate world she is a member of the Critical Friends advisory group to the CEO of Veolia Environment S.A, as well as the Sustainable Development Council of EDF (Électricité de France S.A.).

Previous Board memberships include the,China Council for International Cooperation on Environment and Development (CCICED), an advisory body to the Chinese Government, the Bibliotheca Alexandria, the International Institute for Environment and Development (IEED), Earth Charter International, the World Resources Institute (WRI), the International Research Institute for Climate and Society (IRI), the Lemelson Foundation, ICSU's Committee on Science and Technology in Developing Countries (COSTED) and the InterAcademy Council's Panel on Promoting Worldwide Science and Technology Capacities for the 21st Century. She was also a member of the juries of the Saint Andrew's, Volvo and Alcan Prizes and member of the global jury of the Holcim Awards,. She has participated in corporate environmental advisory boards to the Dow Chemical Company,  to the Coca-Cola Company and as the Chair of the Independent Advisory Board to the Sustainable Biomass Program, advising seven large energy companies.

Awards 
Marton-Lefèvre is the recipient of the AAAS Award for International Cooperation in Science; and has been honoured as a Chevalier de la Légion d’Honneur” by the government of France, and as a Chevalier dans l'Ordre de Saint-Charles by Prince Albert of Monaco. She also received the ProNatura Award from the government of Hungary and the Presidential citation from the Republic of Korea. In 2019, Marton-Lefèvre was recognized with a Lifetime Achievement Award of the National Council for Science and the Environment, and as an Officer de l'Ordre National de Mérite by the President of France.

She is an elected Member of the World Academy of Art and Science, the World Future Council and the Royal Geographical Society.

References

External links
Holcim Awards

French conservationists
Living people
People associated with the International Union for Conservation of Nature
Year of birth missing (living people)
Knights of the Order of Saint-Charles
Chevaliers of the Légion d'honneur
Officers of the Ordre national du Mérite